Fogelmania Productions is an animation studio founded by animator Eric Fogel, known for creating MTV's Celebrity Deathmatch.

Productions
The Head (1994–1996)
Celebrity Deathmatch (1998–2002; 2006–2007)
Charlie and Chunk (2004; shown on the Nicktoons Film Festival)
Starveillance (2007)
Anton and Crapbag (2008)
Glenn Martin, DDS (2009–2011)

References

Adult animation studios
1993 establishments in the United States